Ćetković (Montenegrin Cyrillic: Ћетковић) is a Montenegrin surname. Notable people with the surname include:

Đorđije Ćetković (born 1983 in Podgorica, Montenegro), Montenegrin footballer
Petar Ćetković (born in Cetinje, Montenegro), Partisan Montenegrin War Hero and Commander during World War II
Sergej Ćetković (born 1976 in Podgorica, Montenegro), Montenegrin singer
Stela Ćetković, actress
Vlado Ćetković (born in Podgorica Montenegro), Partisan Montenegrin Commander during World War II
Vojin Ćetković (born 1971 in Krusevac, Serbia), Serbian actor of Montenegrin descent
Jelena Ćetković (born 1916 in Cetinje, Montenegro), Partisan Montenegrin World War II hero
Marko Ćetković (born 1986 in Podgorica, Montenegro), Montenegrin footballer
Romuald Ćetković (born 1973 in Paris, France), independent Businessman

References

Montenegrin surnames
Serbian surnames